Benjamin Banneker School is a historic one-room school building located at Parkville, Platte County, Missouri.  It was built in 1885, and is a one-story, red brick building with gable roof.  It measures approximately 34 feet by 18 feet and sits on a rubble limestone foundation with basement. It served as the primary school for African-American students until about 1902, when a new school was constructed.  It has been converted to a private residence.

It was listed on the National Register of Historic Places in 1995.

References

African-American history of Missouri
One-room schoolhouses in Missouri
School buildings on the National Register of Historic Places in Missouri
School buildings completed in 1885
Buildings and structures in Platte County, Missouri
National Register of Historic Places in Platte County, Missouri
Benjamin Banneker